Credé procedure is the practice of washing a newborn's eyes with a 2% silver nitrate solution to protect against neonatal conjunctivitis caused by Neisseria gonorrhoeae.

The Credé procedure was developed by the German physician Carl Siegmund Franz Credé who implemented it in his hospital in Leipzig in 1880. Between 1881 and 1883, Credé published three papers in Archiv für Gynäkologie, each titled "Die  Verhütung  der  Augenentzündung  der  Neugeborenen" (Prevention of inflammatory eye disease in the newborn), describing his method and its results. The original procedure called for a 2% silver nitrate solution administered immediately after birth; however, this was eventually reduced to a 1% silver nitrate solution to reduce chemical irritation to the newborn's eyes.

In the 1980s, silver nitrate was replaced by erythromycin and tetracycline treatments, which are better tolerated by the eye and more effective against Chlamydia trachomatis in addition to N. gonorrhea.

Notes

The works "Archiv für Gynäkologie" are freely available in the public domain.

References

Obstetrical procedures
Sexually transmitted diseases and infections